is the first full-length studio album by Japanese rock band Wands, released by B-Gram Records on April 17, 1993. It features the No. 1 singles "Toki no Tobira", "Motto Tsuyoku Kimi wo Dakishimetara", and "Sekaijū no Dare Yori Kitto", the latter co-written by Miho Nakayama. Also included is the band's version of the Deen song "Kono Mama Kimi Dake wo Ubaisaritai".

The album became the band's first No. 1 on Oricon's weekly albums chart, selling 410,930 copies on its first week. It charted for 33 weeks and sold 1,626,350 copies. By February 1994, the album was certified as a 2 Million seller by the RIAJ.

Track listing

Charts
Weekly charts

Year-end charts

Certification

References

External links 
 
 

1993 albums
Wands (band) albums
Being Inc. albums
Japanese-language albums
Albums produced by Daiko Nagato